Neuilly-Plaisance is a commune in the eastern suburbs of Paris, France.

The composer Alain Margoni was born in Neuilly-Plaisance on 13 October 1934.

History
The commune of Neuilly-Plaisance was created on 13 April 1892 by detaching its territory from the commune of Neuilly-sur-Marne.
Here was the first community of Emmaus in 1949

Heraldry

Population

Transport
Neuilly-Plaisance is served by Neuilly-Plaisance station on Paris RER line .

Education
Schools:
 Preschools/nurseries (maternelles): Bel Air, Paul Doumer, Foch, Léon Frapié, Paul Letombe, Victor Hugo
 Elementary schools: Bel Air, Cahouettes, Centre, Edouard Herriot, Joffre, Victor Hugo
 Junior high school: Collège Jean Moulin

See also
Communes of the Seine-Saint-Denis department

References

External links
Official website 
Montgomery, Ohio, USA Sister city of Neuilly-Plaisance

Communes of Seine-Saint-Denis